Gianfranco Chávez Massoni (born 10 August 1998) is a Peruvian footballer who plays as a defender for Sporting Cristal.

International career
Chávez made his debut for the Peru national team on 20 January 2022 in a 3–0 home win over Jamaica.

Career statistics

Club

Notes

References

1998 births
Living people
Peruvian footballers
Peru youth international footballers
Association football defenders
Sporting Cristal footballers
Deportivo Coopsol players
Footballers from Lima